Stephen Dorril (born 17 July 1955) is a British academic, author, and journalist. He is a former senior lecturer in the journalism department of Huddersfield University and ex-director of the university's Oral History Unit. His books have mostly been about the UK's intelligence services. With Robin Ramsay, Dorril co-founded the magazine Lobster.  He has appeared on radio and television as a specialist on the security and intelligence services. He is a consultant to BBC's Panorama programme.  His first book Honeytrap, written with Anthony Summers about the Profumo affair, was one of the sources used for the film Scandal (1989).

Career

Dorril has appeared as a specialist and consultant regarding intelligence matters on several radio and television programs: Panorama, Media Show, Secret History, World at One, NBC News, Canadian television, History Channel, French television, and others. Dorril also served as a consultant on a forthcoming Channel Five series on the intelligence services.

Works

Articles
 "Biography." Rogerdog.co.uk

Books
 Honeytrap: The Secret Worlds of Stephen Ward, with Anthony Summers. London: Weidenfeld & Nicolson (1987). .
 Smear!: Wilson and the Secret State. New York: HarperCollins (1992). .
 The Silent Conspiracy: Inside the Intelligence Services in the 1990s. Portsmouth, New Hampshire: Heinemann (1993). .
 MI6: Fifty Years of Special Operations. London: 4th Estate (2000). .
 US Edition: New York: Free Press (2002)
 UK Edition: London: Touchstone (2002)
 MI6: Inside the Covert World of Her Majesty's Secret Intelligence Service. New York: Simon & Schuster (2002). .
 Blackshirt: Sir Oswald Mosley and British Fascism. New York: Viking Press (2006). . See: Excerpted notes + appendix.

Media appearances
 The Man Who Knew Too Much (2021)
 Extended interview.
 L'affaire Jack King (2015)
 BBC Inside Out: Yorkshire and Lincolnshire (2002)
 Spy Secrets: Playing Dirty (2003)

Conference papers
 "The Secret Intelligence Service and Journalists During the Cold War." Delivered at the Journalism and History: Dialogues Conference, University of Sheffield (Sep. 15, 2010).

References

External links 
 Official website
 
 Stephen Durril at Encyclopedia.com
 
 Library of Congress Name Authority File

1955 births
Living people
Academics of the University of Huddersfield
British male journalists
People from Kidderminster